Arthur Ellis Kinsella  (15 January 1918 – 4 March 2004) was a New Zealand politician of the National Party, and was a cabinet minister.

Biography

Early life
Kinsella was born at Waikino in 1918. He was educated at Waihi District High School, Waihi School of Mines, University of Auckland, Victoria University of Wellington and Auckland Teachers College; he graduated with MA and Diploma in Education. He was a farmer and teacher before becoming an MP.

In World War II he served with NZ Engineer Forces (7th Field Company) in UK, Middle East and Greece where he was wounded and returned to New Zealand.

Political career

He was Minister of Broadcasting (1960–1963) in the second National Government under Keith Holyoake, overseeing the introduction of Television to New Zealand. He was Postmaster-General (1961–1963), and was Minister of Education (1963–1969). He retired from Parliament in 1969 following a bad car crash.

As a minister he enabled private stations on radio and television (rather than limit them to direct state stewardship) via the Broadcasting Corporation amendment bill. He also faced a chronic shortage of telephones in New Zealand with a waiting list of 19,000 in the early 1960s. He lengthened the teacher training period from two years to three and attempted to reduce class sizes. He also established a new medical school in Auckland.

In 1970 Kinsella was granted the right to retain the title of The Honourable for life. In 1971 Kinsella was elected to the Auckland City Council serving one term. Later, in 1983 he was elected to the Wellington City Council He lost his seat three years later but regained a seat following a 1987 by-election.

Later life and death
After his retirement from politics, he was a business consultant before his return to teaching as Principal of the Technical Correspondence Institute.

In the 1992 New Year Honours, Kinsella was appointed a Companion of the Queen's Service Order for public services.

Kinsella died in 2004.

Notes

References

|-

|-

|-

1918 births
2004 deaths
Members of the Cabinet of New Zealand
New Zealand National Party MPs
New Zealand schoolteachers
University of Auckland alumni
Victoria University of Wellington alumni
New Zealand education ministers
Members of the New Zealand House of Representatives
New Zealand MPs for North Island electorates
Companions of the Queen's Service Order
20th-century New Zealand politicians
Auckland City Councillors
Wellington City Councillors
New Zealand military personnel of World War II
People from Waikato